Miss Earth 2010, the 10th anniversary of the Miss Earth pageant, was held on 4 December 2010 at the Vinpearl Land Amphitheater in Nha Trang, Vietnam. Larissa Ramos of Brazil crowned her successor Nicole Faria of India at the end of the event. She was the first Miss Earth from India.

Eighty-four contestants from various countries and territories competed for the Miss Earth 2010 title. The event was broadcast live by STAR World, VTV, ABS-CBN, Studio 23, The Filipino Channel, and other partner networks.

The Miss Earth winner serves as the spokesperson for the Miss Earth Foundation, the United Nations Environment Programme (UNEP), and other environmental organizations.

The event was hosted by Oli Pettigrew, host of AXN's Sony Style program, along with Marie Digby and Jennifer Pham with Boyzone lead singer Ronan Keating as the guest performer. Vietnamese singer Mỹ Linh performed during the show.

Results

Placements

Note: Starting this year, there was no "runner-up" in Miss Earth. Instead the titles of Miss Air, Miss Water, and Miss Fire are bestowed on the next three contestants with highest scores after the Miss Earth winner. In this case, the titles went to Miss Ecuador, Jennifer Pazmiño, Miss Thailand, Watsaporn Wattanakoon and Miss Puerto Rico, Yeidy Bosques, respectively.

Note: The Carousel Productions has confirmed that Victoria Schukina is the new Miss Earth Air 2010 after Jennifer Pazmiño (The original Miss Earth Air 2010 of Ecuador) has relinquished her crown due to marriage to her fiancee in February 2011.

Special awards

Major awards

Minor/Sponsor awards

Talent competition
The talent competition took place in Ho Chi Minh City on 9 November 2010. Nicole Faria from India won the Miss Earth Talent 2010 after beating 17 other finalists. The event raised VND100 million, which was donated to the Ho Chi Minh City Red Cross, to support flood victims in the central region.

Note: At that night, Miss Vietnam won a sponsor award which is Miss Vietnam Airlines while Miss India won Miss Diamond Place.

Best in National Costume
The National Costume competition took place at the Sea-Links Resort in Phan Thiết on 13 November 2010. Marina Kishira, from Japan, won the Best in National Costume at Miss Earth 2010 after beating other contestants.

Note: At that night, Miss Japan also won a sponsor award which is Miss Earth Sea-Links City Resort.

Miss Aodai
The Miss Aodai was held on 17 November 2010 in Nha Trang, Khanh Hoa.

Note: At that night, Miss Serbia also won a sponsor award which is Miss Saigon Elegance.

Best in Evening Gown
The Best in Evening Gown was held on 17 November 2010 in Nha Trang, Khánh Hòa.

Note: At that night, Miss Ecuador also won a sponsor award which is Miss PNJ.

Best in Swimsuit
The Best in Swimsuit was held on 20 November 2010 in Phu Yen. Miss Vietnam Lưu Thị Diễm Hương won the Best in Swimsuit.

Note: At that night, Miss Vietnam won a sponsor award which is Miss CanDeluxe.

Order of announcements

Top 14

Top 7

Winning answer
For the 10th anniversary of the contest, Top 7 will meet the questions of conduct from the previous year's competitions. Miss Earth 2010 drew a question in the behavioral contest of Miss Earth 2002: "For you, what is more important: sunrise or sunset?"

Answer of Miss Earth 2010:

Contestants

Judges

Background music
 Opening: Mash-up of "Only Girl (In the World)" by Rihanna, and "Some Chords" by Deadmau5
 "Trống cơm" by Mặt trời mới (Live performance)
 "Lời mẹ hát" (English version) by Mỹ Linh (Live performance)
 "The Way You Make Me Feel" by Ronan Keating (Live performance)
 "When You Say Nothing at All" by Ronan Keating (Live performance)

Schedules
Miss Earth 2010 was held in Vietnam. The announcement was made in a ceremony at the Legend Saigon Hotel in Ho Chi Minh City, Vietnam on 28 January 2010.

The delegates from various countries arrived in Vietnam on 4 November 2010 and participated in a range of activities covering Ho Chi Minh City, Phan Thiet, Hoi An, and Nha Trang. The delegates attended a press conference and various environmental activities in Ho Chi Minh City from 4–13 November. The delegates travelled to Phan Thiet and joined environmental activities and a festival to advertise Vietnam's sports from 15 to 17 November. In the ancient town of Hoi An, they competed in Miss Ao Dai, attended the Earth Hour and the Lantern Festival, to call for fuel saving and natural resource protection from 17 to 19 November. The delegates went back to Nha Trang for charity works, cycling, street cleaning, met with the local residents to talk about environmental protection and participate in various environmental activities, and prepared for the finale night.
 In Ho Chi Minh City: ( 7–11 November)
 7 Nov.: 28 The delegates officially started the activities in Vietnam as the first medication dispensing charity, and also visited Saigon river, and then the Aodai fashion fitting.
 8 Nov.: Meet and Greet with the organizers, the delegates also visited the Da Phuoc Waste treatment – Binh Chanh and Trung Nguyen coffee.
 9 Nov.: Miss Talent Competition
 10 Nov.: Press Presentation – the delegates attended the first official press conference at the White Palace (City) and participated in charity, gifts auction to raise funds for charity.
 11 Nov.: At 6 pm, Gala Dinner which was broadcast live on VTV3 and HTV7 (Ho Chi Minh City Television).
 In Central Vietnam: (12 November – 4 December)
 12 Nov.: Provincial tour at Phan Thiet (Binh Thuan) The delegates engaged in environmental protection; attended the Golf Business Review; evening welcome party for the candidates.
 13 Nov.: National Costume Competition – At 9 am, 84 contestants rehearsed for the national costumes competition and competed on the same day at 6.30 pm, and then the delegates listened to the public address through the Image Beauty, Beauty and auction Friendly items.
 17 Nov.: Miss Aodai and Best in Evening Gown were held in Nha Trang, Khanh Hoa.
 20 Nov.: Best in Swimsuit was held in Phu Yen.
 4 Dec.: Final night – At 8pm (GMT +7), Miss Earth 2010 final night was held in Vinpearl, Nha Trang. Broadcast live on VTV1 and VTV4, ABS-CBN, The Filipino Channel (Philippines), STAR World.

Notes

Debuts

Returns

Last competed in 2005:
 
 
Last competed in 2006:
 
 
 
 
 
Last competed in 2007:
 
 
 
Last competed in 2008:

Replacements
  – Jessica Van Moorleghem was replaced by Melissa Vingerhoed due to personal reasons.
  – Aline Bruch was replaced by Luisa de Almeida Lopes.
  – Ding Wenyuan was replaced by Zhao Shenqianhui.
  – Alejandra Alvarez was replaced by Allyson Alfaro.
  – Christelle Demaison was replaced by Fanny Vauzanges due to family emergency.
  – Anna Julia Hagen was replaced by Reingard Hagemann because of her studies.
  – Liza Elly Purnamasari was replaced by Jessica Aurelia Tji.
  – Andreea Dorobantiu was replaced by Andreea Capsuc.
  – Okelsandra Nikitina was replaced by Valentina Zhytnyk.

Designations
  – Anastasiya Sienina was appointed to represent the autonomous territory. She was the 2nd Runner-up of Miss Ukraine 2010.
  – Tijana Rakić was appointed to represent Serbia. She entered Top 5 Miss Serbia 2010.
  – Mariángela Bonanni was appointed as Miss Earth Venezuela 2009 by Osmel Sousa, the president of Miss Venezuela Organization after the organization took over the franchise from Sambil Model Venezuela Organization. She was the 1st Runner-up of Miss Venezuela 2009.
  – Lưu Thị Diễm Hương was appointed to represent Vietnam this year. She was Miss Vietnam World 2010.

Did not compete

  – Isolina Boero
  – Kinley Yangden
  – Sarai Calderón
  – Taliko Shubitidze
  – Dilrufa Mohamed
  – Pierra Akewro

Withdrawals
 
 
  – No national pageant held
 
 
  – Original contestant Jennifer Kalo ended up competing at Miss World 2010 due to Agnes Dobo injury.
 
 
 
 
  – Lack of funding and sponsorship
  – No national pageant held; lack of funding and sponsorship

References

External links

 
 Miss Earth 2010 official website
 Special page for Miss Earth 2010 on VnExpress
 Miss Earth Foundation website

2010
2010 beauty pageants
2010 in Vietnam
Beauty pageants in Vietnam